Horatius Paulijn (1644, Amsterdam – 1691, Amsterdam), was a Dutch Golden Age painter.

Biography
According to Houbraken who was told his fortunes by the painter Johannes Voorhout, Paulyn was a god-fearing man who planned a trip to the Holy Land with Jan Rote and travelled with him to London and Hamburg in search of travel companions, but came back to Amsterdam after their flags and other equipment was stolen. Voorhout had met him in Hamburg along with a seascape painter by the name of Bellevois and the landscape painter Matthias Scheits.

According to the RKD he is registered as a painter of portraits and genre scenes and travelled to England, Denmark,  and in 1675, Hamburg. A work from Amsterdam is dated 1682.

References

Horatius Paulijn on Artnet

1644 births
1691 deaths
Dutch Golden Age painters
Dutch male painters
Painters from Amsterdam